Beach House 3 is the second studio album by American singer Ty Dolla Sign. It was released on October 27, 2017, by Atlantic Records. The album serves as the third installment in his Beach House series. It features guest appearances from Pharrell Williams, Lil Wayne, Tory Lanez, The-Dream, YG, Future, Swae Lee, Wiz Khalifa, Damian Marley and Lauren Jauregui, among others. The album's production was handled by Mike Will Made It, DJ Mustard, Skrillex, Mike Dean, Apex Martin, MariiBeatz, Dun Deal and James Royo, among others.

Beach House 3 was supported by four official singles: "Love U Better", "So Am I", "Ex" and "Pineapple". The album received generally positive reviews from critics and debuted at number 11 on the US Billboard 200, earning 29,000 album-equivalent units in its first week. The album was certified gold by the Recording Industry Association of America (RIAA) in October 2020.

Background
On June 19, 2016, Ty Dolla Sign confirmed that he was working on Beach House 3 via Instagram. The album's pre-order was announced on September 20, 2017, along with the cover art. The tracklist was revealed on October 23, 2017.

On May 8, 2018, Ty Dolla Sign announced on Twitter that the deluxe edition of Beach House 3 will be released shortly, along with six new tracks.

Promotion
The album's lead single, "Love U Better" featuring Lil Wayne and The-Dream, was released July 10, 2017. The album's second single, "So Am I" featuring Damian Marley and Skrillex, was released on September 1, 2017. "Message in a Bottle" and "Dawsin's Breek" featuring Jeremih, were released as the album's first two promotional singles on September 20, simultaneously. "Ex" featuring YG, was released on October 6, 2017, as the album's third promotional single. It was later sent to rhythmic radio as the album's third single (second and final single sent to radio). The album's fourth promotional single, "Don't Judge Me", was premiered by Ebro on Beats 1 and released on October 18, 2017.

"Pineapple" featuring Gucci Mane and Quavo, was released on March 30, 2018, as the album's fourth and final single (first from the deluxe edition). "Clout" featuring 21 Savage, was released on May 9, 2018, as the album's fifth promotional single.

Critical reception

Beach House 3 was met with generally positive reviews. At Metacritic, which assigns a normalized rating out of 100 to reviews from professional publications, the album received an average score of 77, based on eight reviews.

Andy Kellman of AllMusic gave a positive review, stating "Peeling away the factors that obscure Griffin's talent—the vulgar hedonism, the cavalcade of predominantly superfluous guest artists—can take some effort. Beach House III is nonetheless conclusive evidence that the singer, rapper, songwriter, producer, and multi-instrumentalist is among the most skilled and creative figures in the business". Corrigan B of Tiny Mix Tapes said, "Beach House 3 is a strong, strong effort: universally pleasant in the same way as its antecedents, but given a thorough sonic update so as to keep pace with modernity". Riley Wallace of HipHopDX considered the album an improvement to Ty Dolla Sign's preceding project Campaign, stating Beach House 3 is "a great listen. Where Campaign (though dope) may have lacked some serious earworm moments, this album picks up the remaining tab — with change to spare. Even with nothing to truly prove, Ty Dolla $ign managed to once again assert dominance in an overcrowded lane of crooners who get likened to rappers". Scott Glaysher of XXL wrote positively, "Beach House 3 truly is Ty Dolla $ign's best work to date. He manages to please with his collaborative hits and hooks all while maintaining artistic integrity with his more introspective tracks".

Clayton Purdom of The A.V. Club said, "While 2015's Free TC felt designed to impress, a little too encyclopedic and earnest for its own good, Beach House 3 takes its concept literally, soundtracking a hypothetical bender in a paradise where the comedown never arrives". Paul A. Thompson of Pitchfork noted, "A superbly refined collection of songs, carefully crafted and smartly cast. It doesn't have the longer thematic crescendos of TC, but is even more ruthlessly listenable, stacking hooks on top of hooks and flitting between an array different, pop-viable aesthetic frameworks". In a mixed review, NMEs Jordan Bassett stated: "Lyrically, Beach House 3 is a step away from the musician's satin-sheeted comfort zone, but we may have to wait for Beach House 4 to see him truly come of age." In a more mixed review, Ben Beaumont-Thomas of The Observer described the album as "a narrow, unimaginative collection".

Rankings

Commercial performance
Beach House 3 debuted at number 11 on the US Billboard 200 chart, earning 29,000 album-equivalent units, (including 6,000 were pure album sales) in its first week. The album also debuted at number eight on the US Top R&B/Hip-Hop Albums chart, becoming his second top-ten debut on this chart. On October 19, 2020, the album was certified gold by the Recording Industry Association of America (RIAA) for combined sales and album-equivalent units of over 500,000 units in the United States.

Track listing

Notes
  signifies a co-producer
  signifies an additional producer
 "Famous" features uncredited vocals from John Mayer
 "Stare" features background vocals from ASAP Rocky

Sample credits
 "Famous Lies" contains a sample of "Feel the Fire", performed by Peabo Bryson.
 "Love U Better" contains samples of "I Can Love You", performed by Mary J. Blige; and "Feel the Fire", performed by Peabo Bryson.
 "Ex" contains a sample of "Only You", performed by 112 featuring The Notorious B.I.G.
 "All the Time" contains a sample of "The Champ", performed by The Mohawks.

Personnel
Credits were adapted from Tidal.

Technical

 Andy Barnes – recording engineer (tracks 1–3, 5, 10–12, 14, 16–18, 19), additional mixing engineer (tracks 1, 2, 5, 10, 11, 14, 16, 18–20), additional recording (track 13)
 James Royo – mixing engineer (tracks 1, 2, 4, 5, 11, 16–20), recording engineer (tracks 3, 10, 17)
 Dave Kutch – mastering engineer (tracks 1, 2, 4–7, 9–11, 13–20)
 Todd Norman – engineer (tracks 1, 2, 4, 10, 11, 14, 16, 18, 20), assistant mixing engineer (tracks 5, 17, 19)
 Jo McLean – engineer (tracks 1, 12, 17)
 Matthew Sim – assistant engineer (tracks 1, 2, 4, 5, 10, 11, 16, 18–20)
 Manny Park – assistant engineer (tracks 1, 2, 4, 5, 10, 11, 16, 18–20)
 Alex Layne – engineer (tracks 2, 5, 11, 12, 16, 18)
 Jaycen Joshua – mixing engineer (tracks 3, 13, 15)
 David Nakaji – engineer (tracks 3, 13, 15)
 Ivan Jimenez – engineer (track 3)
 Andrew Grossman – engineer (tracks 3, 10, 19)
 Nathaniel Alford – additional recording (track 3)
 Sauce Miyagi – recording engineer (tracks 4, 13, 15)
 Jean-Marie Horvat – mastering engineer (track 4), additional mixing engineer (tracks 13, 15)
 Mike Larson – recording engineer (track 10)
 Thomas Cullison – engineer (track 10)
 Iain Findlay – engineer (track 10)
 Poo Bear – recording engineer (track 12)
 Skrillex – mastering engineer (track 12), mixing engineer (track 12)
 Ben Milchev – assistant engineer (tracks 13, 15)
 Morning Estrada – engineer (track 19)

Charts

Certifications

Release history

References

2017 albums
Albums produced by Hitmaka
Albums produced by DJ Mustard
Albums produced by Mike Will Made It
Albums produced by Mike Dean (record producer)
Albums produced by Pharrell Williams
Albums produced by Southside (record producer)
Albums produced by Cubeatz
Albums produced by D'Mile
Albums produced by Jake One
Atlantic Records albums
Ty Dolla Sign albums